The participation of Latvia in the Junior Eurovision Song Contest first began at the inaugural Junior Eurovision Song Contest in  which took place in Copenhagen, Denmark. Latvijas Televīzija (LTV), a member of the European Broadcasting Union (EBU), were responsible for the selection process of their participation. Latvia used a national selection format, broadcasting shows entitled "Bērnu Eirovīzija" and later "Balss Pavēlnieks", for their participation at the contests. The first representative to participate for the nation at the 2003 contest was Dzintars Čīča with the song "Tu esi vasarā", which finished in ninth place out of sixteen participating entries, achieving a score of thirty-seven points.

History
Latvia are one of the sixteen countries to have made their debut at the inaugural Junior Eurovision Song Contest 2003, which took place on 15 November 2003 at the Forum in Copenhagen, Denmark. The country's worst placing came in  when Mārtiņš Tālbergs and C-Stones Juniors placed 17th and last with "Balts vai melns".

The broadcaster has selected Šarlote Lēnmane to represent Latvia at the Junior Eurovision Song Contest 2010 in Minsk with the song "Viva La Dance". Šarlote won 10th place with 51 points.

On 27 June 2012, LTV announced Latvia's withdrawal from the competition and the country has never returned since. LTV later confirmed their non-participation in 2013, 2014 and 2015.

On 19 November 2015, it was announced that the Baltic countries, including Latvia, were interested in taking part in the 2016 contest. However, on 23 May 2016, the LTV confirmed it would not return to the contest in 2016.

Participation overview

Commentators and spokespersons

The contests are broadcast online worldwide through the official Junior Eurovision Song Contest website junioreurovision.tv and YouTube. In 2015, the online broadcasts featured commentary in English by junioreurovision.tv editor Luke Fisher and 2011 Bulgarian Junior Eurovision Song Contest entrant Ivan Ivanov. The Latvian broadcaster, LTV, sent their own commentators to the contest in order to provide commentary in the Latvian language. Spokespersons were also chosen by the national broadcaster in order to announce the awarding points from Latvia. The table below list the details of each commentator and spokesperson since 2003.

See also
Latvia in the Eurovision Song Contest – Senior version of the Junior Eurovision Song Contest.
Latvia in the Eurovision Choir of the Year – A competition organised by the EBU for amateur choirs.
Latvia in the Eurovision Young Dancers – A competition organised by the EBU for younger dancers aged between 16 and 21.
Latvia in the Eurovision Young Musicians – A competition organised by the EBU for musicians aged 18 years and younger.

References

Countries in the Junior Eurovision Song Contest
Junior